CKCJ-FM is a Canadian radio station, broadcasting at 97.9 FM in Lebel-sur-Quévillon, Quebec. Owned and operated by Le son du 49e, the station broadcasts a community radio format.

The station was licensed by the Canadian Radio-television and Telecommunications Commission in 2016, and commenced broadcasting in 2018.

The station is a member of the Association des radiodiffuseurs communautaires du Québec.

References

External links

KCJ
KCJ
KCJ
Radio stations established in 2018
2018 establishments in Quebec